SimG Records is an independent record label, dedicated to the promotion of new musical theatre and new writers to the British audience.  It was founded by London-based director/producer Simon Greiff in 2009.  Its affiliate company, SimG Productions showcases new work on stage, in concerts, cabarets, plays and on CD.  In 2014, SimG Records releases were nominated for seven Broadway World Album Awards.

Critical Praise for SimG Founder, Simon Greiff
Mark Shenton of The Stage wrote, "Simon Greiff does more individually to support new writers than just about anyone in British Theatre."

Albums 
Original Cast Recording
  A Spoonful of Sherman (A.Sherman/R.M. & R.B. Sherman/R.J.Sherman)
  The A-Z of Mrs. P. (Gwyneth Herbert / Diane Samuels)
  The Bakewell Bake Off (The Baking Committee)
  Before After (Price/Knapman)
  Beyond The Gate: a musical revue (various)
  Bumblescratch (R.J.Sherman)
  Girl In A Crisis (Andrew Fisher) 
  Imaginary (musical)|Imaginary (Price/Knapman)
  Love Birds (R.J.Sherman)
  Molly Wobbly’s Tit Factory (Paul Boyd)
  Sleeping Arrangements (Chris Burgess)
  Soho Cinders - Live Concert Recording (Stiles/Drewe)
  A Song Cycle For Soho (various)
  Stand Tall: A Rock Musical  (L. Wyatt-Buchan, A. & S. Chalmers)
  Ushers: The Front of House Musical (Yiannis Koutsakos / James Oban)Studio Cast Recording  Goldilocks and the Three Bears  (Stiles/Drewe)
  My Land's Shore (Christopher Orton/Robert Gould)
  Paradise Lost (Lee Ormsby/Jonathan Wakeham)
  The Three Little Pigs (Stiles/Drewe)Concept Recording  Comrade Rockstar (Julian Woolford/ Richard John)
  The Confession Room (Dan Looney/ Patrick Wilde)
  Ms. A Song Cycle (Rory Sherman/various)
  Van Winkle: a folk musical (Caroline Wigmore)Composer/Lyricist Recording  Acoustic Overtures: The Songs of Dougal Irvine (Dougal Irvine)
  Collaborations: The Songs Of Elliot Davis (Elliot Davis)
  Love, Lies and Lyrics: The Words of Lesley Ross (Lesley Ross)
  Somewhere In My Mind: The Songs of Joe Sterling (Joe Sterling)West End Vocalists  Annalene Beechey - Close Your Eyes
  Ben Stock - And There Was Music
  Caroline Sheen - Raise The Curtain 
  Richard Woodford - Because Of You  Simon Bailey - Looking Up  Stephen de Martin - One Voice  Stuart Matthew Price - All Things In Time''

External links
 discogs.com profile: SimG Records

References

Record labels established in 2009
British independent record labels
Musical theatre record labels
2009 establishments in the United Kingdom